Rayyan Air was a Pakistani airline based in Pakistan and the UAE. Rayyan Air held Pakistan Civil Aviation Authority Air Operator Certificate alongside Charter Licence for passenger, cargo, and charter operations.

The company ended cargo operations in 2015.

Services 
Passenger air services
Cargo air services
Ground handling
Aircraft management

Fleet 
Rayyan Air fleet consisted of Boeing 747-200F:

References

http://www.rayyanair.com/index.php
https://www.planespotters.net/airline/Rayyan-Air

Defunct airlines of Pakistan
Airlines established in 2009
Airlines disestablished in 2015
Companies based in Karachi
Pakistani companies established in 2009
Pakistani companies disestablished in 2015